Ischnochitonidae is a family of polyplacophoran mollusc belonging to the superfamily Chitonoidea.

Subfamilies and genera
 Ischnochitoninae Dall, 1889
 Callistochiton Dall, 1879: belongs to the family Callistoplacidae
 Simplischnochiton Van Belle, 1974: synonym of Ischnochiton Gray, 1847
 Lepidozona Pilsbry, 1892
 Radsiella Pilsbry, 1892
 Stenochiton H. Adams & Angas, 1864
 Stenoplax Dall, 1879
 Stenosemus Middendorff, 1847
 Subterenochiton Iredale & Hull, 1924
Thermochiton Saito & Okutani, 1990
 Tonicina Thiele, 1906
 Tripoplax S. S. Berry, 1919

 Callistoplacinae Pilsbry, 1893raised to family level Callistoplacidae Pilsbry, 1893 
 Callochitoninae: raised to family levelCallochitonidae Plate, 1901
 Lepidochitoninae Iredale, 1914: synonym of Tonicellinae Simroth, 1894
Not belonging to a subfamily
 Bathychiton Dell'Angelo & Palazzi, 1988
 Connexochiton Kaas, 1979
 Ischnochiton Gray, 1847

Synonyms
 Anisoradsia Iredale & May, 1916: synonym of Ischnochiton Gray, 1847 
 Autochiton Iredale & Hull, 1924: synonym of Ischnochiton Gray, 1847
 Basiliochiton S. S. Berry, 1918: synonym of Dendrochiton S. S. Berry, 1911
 Chartoplax Iredale & Hull, 1924: synonym of Ischnochiton Gray, 1847
 Chondropleura Thiele, 1906: synonym of Stenosemus Middendorff, 1847
 Gurjanovillia Yakovleva, 1952: synonym of Tripoplax S. S. Berry, 1919 (junior synonym)
 Haploplax Pilsbry, 1894: synonym ofIschnochiton Gray, 1847 (synonym)
 Heterozona Carpenter [in Dall], 1879: synonym of Ischnochiton (Heterozona) Carpenter [in Dall], 1879 represented as Ischnochiton Gray, 1847
 Ischnoradsia Shuttleworth, 1853: synonym of Ischnochiton (Ischnoradsia) Shuttleworth, 1853 represented as Ischnochiton Gray, 1847
 Lepidopleuroides Thiele, 1928: synonym of Stenosemus Middendorff, 1847 (objective synonym)
 Lepidoradsia Carpenter, 1879: synonym of Ischnoradsia Shuttleworth, 1853: synonym of Ischnochiton (Ischnoradsia) Shuttleworth, 1853 represented as Ischnochiton Gray, 1847
 Lophochiton Ashby, 1923: synonym of Callistochiton Carpenter [in Dall], 1879 (junior synonym)
 Lophyropsis Thiele, 1893: synonym ofIschnochiton Gray, 1847 
 Lophyrochiton Yakovleva, 1952: synonym of Stenosemus Middendorff, 1847 (objective synonym)
 Lophyrus G.O. Sars, 1878: synonym of Stenosemus Middendorff, 1847
 Maugerella Carpenter [in Dall], 1879: synonym of Stenoplax Carpenter, 1879
 Ocellochiton Ashby, 1939: synonym of Callochiton Gray, 1847
 Paricoplax Iredale & Hull, 1929: synonym of Callochiton Gray, 1847 
 Stenoradsia Carpenter [in Dall], 1879: synonym of Stenoplax (Stenoradsia) Carpenter in Dall, 1879 represented as Stenoplax Carpenter, 1879 (original combination)
 Variolepis Plate, 1899: synonym of Chaetopleura Shuttleworth, 1853
 Zostericola Ashby, 1919: synonym of Stenochiton H. Adams & Angas, 1864

References

 Vaught, K.C.; Tucker Abbott, R.; Boss, K.J. (1989). A classification of the living Mollusca. American Malacologists: Melbourne. ISBN 0-915826-22-4. XII, 195 pp

 
Chiton families